Takura Tendayi is a Zimbabwean singer and songwriter. He is well known for his frequent collaborations with Chase & Status and Sub Focus, as well as many other dubstep and drum and bass artists. His guest appearances have accumulated over 17 million views on YouTube , and his song "Flashing Lights" has charted in the United Kingdom at number 98 in the UK Singles Chart and number 15 in the UK Dance Chart. He managed to share a stage with Plan B and also co-wrote Rihanna's 2009 single "Wait Your Turn" which has over 28 million views on YouTube. This song was charted at number 45 in the UK Singles Chart. On 10 September 2013, Door Policy released the three-track EP No Cover Charge for free download. It features a guest appearance from "Traktor" singer L Marshall.

Discography

Singles

As lead artist

As featured artist

Other appearances

Unreleased tracks

References

21st-century Zimbabwean male singers
People from Harare
Living people
1988 births